Wave machine may refer to:

Wave power, a machine that uses the motion of ocean waves to generate electricity
Wave pool, a machine that generates waves in a pool to simulate the ocean 
Shive wave machine, a wave generator that illustrates wave motion using steel rods and a thin wire
Column wave, a theatrical device used to simulate the look of the ocean on stage
Permanent wave machine, a machine that curls or straightens hair for a permanent wave hairstyle